CBSA may refer to:

Canada Border Services Agency, a federal law enforcement agency that is responsible for border control
Core-based statistical area, a U.S. geographic area defined by the Office of Management and Budget
List of core-based statistical areas